Dame Edith Margaret Emily Ashcroft  (22 December 1907 – 14 June 1991), known professionally as Peggy Ashcroft, was an English actress whose career spanned more than 60 years. 

Born to a comfortable middle-class family, Ashcroft was determined from an early age to become an actress, despite parental opposition. She was working in smaller theatres even before graduating from drama school, and within two years she was starring in the West End. Ashcroft maintained her leading place in British theatre for the next 50 years. Always attracted by the ideals of permanent theatrical ensembles, she did much of her work for the Old Vic in the early 1930s, John Gielgud's companies in the 1930s and 1940s, the Shakespeare Memorial Theatre and its successor the Royal Shakespeare Company from the 1950s, and the National Theatre from the 1970s.

While well regarded in Shakespeare, Ashcroft was also known for her commitment to modern drama, appearing in plays by Bertolt Brecht, Samuel Beckett and Harold Pinter. Her career was almost wholly spent in the live theatre until the 1980s. She then turned to television and cinema with considerable success, winning two BAFTAs and an Academy Award.

Life and career

Early years
Ashcroft was born in Croydon, Surrey, (now in Greater London) the younger child and only daughter of Violetta Maud, née Bernheim (1874–1926) and William Worsley Ashcroft (1878–1918), a land agent. According to Michael Billington, her biographer, Violetta Ashcroft was of Danish and German Jewish descent and a keen amateur actress. Ashcroft's father was killed on active service in the First World War. She attended Woodford School, East Croydon, where one of her teachers encouraged her love of Shakespeare, but neither her teachers nor her mother approved of her desire to become a professional actress. Ashcroft was determined, however, and at the age of 16, she enrolled at the Central School of Speech and Drama, run by Elsie Fogerty, from whom her mother had taken lessons some years before. The school's emphasis was on the voice and elegant diction, which did not appeal to Ashcroft or to her fellow pupil Laurence Olivier. She learned more from reading My Life in Art by Constantin Stanislavski, the influential director of the Moscow Art Theatre.

While still a student, Ashcroft made her professional stage debut at the Birmingham Repertory Theatre in a revival of J. M. Barrie's Dear Brutus opposite Ralph Richardson, with whom she had been greatly impressed when she saw him in Charles Doran's touring company while she was still a schoolgirl. She graduated from the Central School in 1927 with London University's Diploma in Dramatic Art. Never much drawn to the West End or stardom, she learned her craft with mostly small companies in fringe theatres. Her first notable West End role was Naemi in Jew Süss in 1929, an extravagantly theatrical production, in which she won praise for the naturalism and truth of her playing. In the same year she married Rupert Hart-Davis, then an aspiring actor and later a publisher. He later described the marriage as "a sad failure: we were much too young to know what we wanted ... after much agony we parted and were duly divorced. Nowadays Peggy and I lunch together perhaps once or twice a year in a Soho restaurant and have a lovely nostalgic-romantic talk of shared memories of long ago. She is a lovely person and the best actress living."

1930s
In 1930 Ashcroft was cast as Desdemona in a production of Othello at the Savoy Theatre, starring Paul Robeson in the title role. The production was not well received, but Ashcroft's notices were excellent. The production prompted a political awakening in Ashcroft, who was astonished to receive hate mail for appearing onstage with a black actor; she was angry that Robeson was not welcome at the Savoy Hotel, despite being the star at the adjoining Savoy Theatre. During the run she had a brief affair with Robeson, which, followed by another with the writer J. B. Priestley, put an end to Robeson's marriage to Essie Robeson and her first marriage. Hart-Davis was granted a divorce in 1933, on the grounds of Ashcroft's adultery with the director Theodore Komisarjevsky.

Among those impressed by Ashcroft's performance as Desdemona was John Gielgud, recently established as a West End star. He recalled, "When Peggy came on in the Senate scene it was as if all the lights in the theatre had suddenly gone up". In 1932 he was invited by the Oxford University Dramatic Society to try his hand at directing, in the society's production of Romeo and Juliet. Ashcroft as Juliet and Edith Evans as the nurse won golden notices, although their director, already notorious for his innocent slips of the tongue, referred to them as "Two leading ladies, the like of whom I hope I shall never meet again."

Ashcroft joined the Old Vic company for the 1932–33 season. The theatre, in an unfashionable area of London south of the Thames, was run by Lilian Baylis to offer plays and operas to a mostly working-class audience at low ticket prices. She paid her performers modest wages, but the theatre was known for its unrivaled repertory of classics, mostly Shakespeare, and many West End stars took a large pay cut to work there. It was, in Sheridan Morley's words, the place to learn Shakespearean technique and try new ideas. During the season Ashcroft played five Shakespeare heroines, as well as Kate in She Stoops to Conquer, Mary Stuart in a new play by John Drinkwater, and Lady Teazle in The School for Scandal. In 1933 she made her first film, The Wandering Jew. She was not attracted to the medium of cinema and made only four more films over the next quarter-century.

During her professional and personal relationship with Komisarjevsky, whom she married in 1934 and left in 1936, Ashcroft learned from him what Billington calls "the vital importance of discipline, perfectionism, and the idea that the actor, even during passages of emotional stress, must remain a thinking human being".

After appearing in the Hitchcock film The 39 Steps (1935), and a succession of stage failures, Ashcroft was once again cast as Juliet by Gielgud, this time in a West End production that attracted enormous attention. It ran from October 1935 to March 1936, and Ashcroft's Romeos were played in alternation by Olivier and Gielgud. Critical opinions differed as to the relative merits of her leading men, but Ashcroft won glowing reviews. In May 1936 Komisarjevsky directed a production of The Seagull, with Evans as Arkadina, Gielgud as Trigorin and Ashcroft as Nina. The recent collapse of her marriage to the director made rehearsals difficult, but the critical reception was ecstatic.

After playing briefly and without much pleasure in New York, Ashcroft returned to London in 1937 for a season of four plays presented by Gielgud at the Queen's Theatre. She played the Queen in Richard II, Lady Teazle in The School for Scandal, Irina in Three Sisters and Portia in The Merchant of Venice. The company included Harry Andrews, Glen Byam Shaw, George Devine, Michael Redgrave and Harcourt Williams, with Angela Baddeley and Gwen Ffrangcon-Davies as guests. The directors were Gielgud himself, Tyrone Guthrie and Michel Saint-Denis. Billington considers that this company laid the foundations of post-war ensembles such as the Royal Shakespeare Company and the National Theatre. The Munich crisis and the approach of the Second World War delayed for a decade the further development of such a company.

1940s and 1950s
In 1940. Ashcroft met and married the rising lawyer Jeremy Hutchinson. They had a daughter, Eliza, the following year, and Ashcroft did little stage work while the child was young. Her main appearances during the war years were in Gielgud's company at the Haymarket Theatre in 1944, playing Ophelia in Hamlet, Titania in A Midsummer Night's Dream and the title role in The Duchess of Malfi. She won excellent notices, but the productions were thought to lack flair and were unfavourably compared with the exciting work of the rival Old Vic company under Richardson and Olivier's leadership. After the Haymarket season Ashcroft resumed her break from the theatre, first campaigning for her husband, who stood as a Labour candidate in the 1945 general election, and then having a second child, Nicholas, in 1946.

Returning to the stage in 1947, Ashcroft had two long-running successes in a row as the alcoholic Evelyn Holt in Edward, My Son, in the West End and then on Broadway, and the downtrodden Catherine Sloper in The Heiress in 1949.

Ashcroft began the 1950s with a return to Shakespeare, at the Shakespeare Memorial Theatre, Stratford-upon-Avon, playing Beatrice to Gielgud's Benedick in Much Ado About Nothing and Cordelia to his King Lear. In 1951 she returned to the Old Vic, playing Viola in Twelfth Night, the title role in Electra and Mistress Page in The Merry Wives of Windsor. In the second of these, according to Billington, "she scaled the austere peaks of Greek tragedy".

Through the rest of the decade, Ashcroft's career switched between commercial productions in the West End and appearances in the nascent subsidised theatres in Shakespeare and experimental works. In the former she made a deep impression as the adulterous, suicidal Hester Collyer in Terence Rattigan's The Deep Blue Sea (1952) and was well reviewed as the governess Miss Madrigal in Enid Bagnold's The Chalk Garden (1956). Her roles for non-commercial managements were in Shakespeare at Stratford and on tour, Hedda Gabler (1954) and the double role of Shen Te and Shui Ta in The Good Woman of Setzuan (1956). The last of these was not a success, but Ashcroft was credited with courage for taking the role on.

In 1958, Peter Hall, who had been appointed to run the Shakespeare Memorial Theatre, approached Ashcroft with his plans for a permanent company, with bases in Stratford and London, and a regular, salaried company, presenting a mixture of classical and new plays. Ashcroft immediately agreed to join him, and her lead was, in Hall's view, key to the success of the new Royal Shakespeare Company (RSC).

1960s

In the RSC's first seasons Ashcroft played Katharina in The Taming of the Shrew, Paulina in The Winter's Tale (1960), The Duchess of Malfi (1961), Emilia in Othello (1961) and Ranevskaya in The Cherry Orchard, opposite Gielgud as Gaev. These were generally well reviewed, but her performance in The Wars of the Roses in 1963 and 1964 had the critics searching for superlatives. The production was a reshaping of Shakespeare's three Henry VI plays and Richard III. Ashcroft, then aged fifty-six, played Margaret of Anjou, ageing from blithe youth to ferocious old age as the plays progressed. The critic Philip Hope-Wallace wrote of:

At about this time Ashcroft's third and last marriage was beginning to fall apart. According to Billington she found solace in her work, and threw herself into classical and avant garde works "with ever greater fervour". Her roles in the 1960s were Arkadina in The Seagull (1964), Mother in Marguerite Duras's Days in the Trees (1966), Mrs Alving in Ibsen's Ghosts (1967), Agnes in Edward Albee's A Delicate Balance (1969), Beth in Pinter's Landscape (1969) and Katharine of Aragon in Henry VIII (1969).

Later years
In the 1970s, Ashcroft remained a pillar of the RSC but when Peter Hall succeeded Olivier as director of the National Theatre in 1973 he persuaded her to appear there from time to time. She also appeared at the Royal Court in Duras's The Lovers of Viorne (1971) in the role of a schizophrenic killer, a performance that the young Helen Mirren found so accomplished that "I just wanted to rush out and start all over again". Many were surprised when Ashcroft appeared with Richardson at the Savoy in 1972 in what was by all appearances a conventional West End drawing room comedy, Lloyd George Knew My Father, by William Douglas-Home, but the two stars revealed unexpected depths in their characters.

For the National, Ashcroft appeared in Ibsen's John Gabriel Borkman, Beckett's Happy Days, Lillian Hellman's Watch on the Rhine and Pinter's Family Voices. Her RSC roles were Lidya in Aleksei Arbuzov's Old World (1976), and her last stage part was the Countess in All's Well That Ends Well, which she played at Stratford in 1981 and in London in 1982.

Ashcroft later made occasional, but highly successful, television and film appearances. For The Jewel in the Crown she won a BAFTA award for best actress in 1984, and for her portrayal of Mrs. Moore in David Lean's 1984 film A Passage to India she won another BAFTA best actress award and the 1985 Oscar for Best Supporting Actress; this made her the oldest person to win the Oscar for Best Supporting Actress, at 77 years 93 days old. Her final performance was also in a work about India, the radio play In the Native State by Tom Stoppard.

She was the grandmother of the French singer Emily Loizeau.

Ashcroft died of a stroke in London at the age of 83. Her ashes were scattered around a mulberry tree in the Great Garden at New Place, Stratford-upon-Avon, which she had planted in 1969. A memorial service was held in Westminster Abbey on 30 November 1991.

Honours, awards and memorials
Ashcroft's British state honours were Commander of the Order of the British Empire (CBE) in 1951 and Dame Commander of the Order (DBE) in 1956. Her foreign state honours were the King's Gold Medal, Norway (1955), and the Order of St Olav, Norway (Commander, 1976). She was awarded honorary degrees by eight universities and was an honorary fellow of St Hugh's College, Oxford. She was awarded a British Film Institute Fellowship in 1989. In addition to the Oscar and BAFTA awards, she received a Laurence Olivier Award for Best Actress in a New Play for Old World in 1976, a Venice Film Festival Award for She's Been Away (1989), a BAFTA Award for the television play Caught on a Train (1980), a special award from the British Theatre Association for the television play Cream in My Coffee (1982), a special award from BAFTA (1990) and a special Laurence Olivier Award (1991).

Ashcroft is commemorated with a memorial plaque in Poets' Corner, Westminster Abbey. The Ashcroft Theatre in Croydon was named in her honour in 1962. The Royal Shakespeare Company has an Ashcroft Room directly above the Swan Theatre in Stratford-upon-Avon named after her, used for play rehearsals.

Filmography

Film

Television
{| class="wikitable sortable"
! Year
! width="220px"|Title
! width="100px"|Role
! class="unsortable" | Notes
|-
|1939
|The Tempest
|Miranda
|The Tempest, The Tempest/II TV Films
|-
| 1939
| Twelfth Night|Viola
|
|-
|1959
|BBC Sunday-Night Theatre|Julia Rajk
|Episode:  Shadow of Heroes
|-
|1962
|The Cherry Orchard|Mme. Lyubov Andreyeyna Ranevsky
|
|-
|1965
|Theatre 625|Rebecca West
|Episode: Rosmersholm
Nominated – British Academy Television Award for Best Actress (also for The Wars of the Roses)
|-
|1965
|The Wars of the Roses|Margaret of Anjou
|Nominated – British Academy Television Award for Best Actress (also for Rosmersholm) 
|-
|1966
|ITV Play of the Week|Mrs. Patrick Campbell
|Episode: Dear Liar
|-
| 1967
| The Wednesday Play: Days in the Trees|The Mother
|Guest Star
|-
|1968
|From Chekhov with Love|Olga Knipper 
|TV Film
|-
|1972
|ITV Sunday Night Theatre|Sonya
|Episode: The Last Journey
|-
|1976
|Arena|Winnie
|Episode: Theatre, TV Series Documentary
|-
| 1978
| Hullabaloo Over Georgie and Bonnie's Pictures|Lady G
| Nominated – British Academy Television Award for Best Actress (also for Edward & Mrs. Simpson)
|-
| 1978
| Edward & Mrs. Simpson| Queen Mary
| Nominated – British Academy Television Award for Best Actress (also for Hullabaloo Over Georgie and Bonnie's Pictures)
|-
| rowspan=3|1980
| Caught on a Train| Frau Messner
|
|-
| Cream in My Coffee|Jean Wilsher
| British Academy Television Award for Best Actress (also for BBC2 Playhouse)
|-
| BBC2 Playhouse|
| British Academy Television Award for Best Actress (also for Cream in My Coffee)
|-
| 1982
| Play of the Month: Little Eyolf| The Rat Wife
|
|-
| 1984
| The Jewel in the Crown| Barbie Batchelor
| British Academy Television Award for Best ActressNominated – Golden Globe Award for Best Actress – Miniseries or Television FilmNominated – Primetime Emmy Award for Outstanding Lead Actress in a Miniseries or a Movie
|-
| 1987
| A Perfect Spy|Miss Dubber
| Nominated – Primetime Emmy Award for Outstanding Supporting Actress in a Miniseries or a Movie
|-
|1989
|The Heat of the Day|Nettie
|TV Film
|-
| 1989
| Screen One: She's Been Away| Lillian Huckle
| Venice Film Festival – Golden Ciak Award for Best ActressVenice Film Festival – Pasinetti Award for Best ActressVolpi Cup for Best ActressNominated – British Academy Television Award for Best Actress
|-
|1990
|Murder by the Book|Agatha Christie
|
|}

RadioThe Duchess of Malfi BBC Third Programme (1954)Macbeth BBC Third Programme (1966)Family Voices BBC Radio 3 (1981)Chances BBC Radio 3 (1981)In the Native State'' BBC Radio 3 (1991)

Notes, references and sources

Notes

References

Sources

External links

 
 
 
 

1907 births
1991 deaths
20th-century English actresses
Actresses awarded damehoods
Actresses from Surrey
Alumni of the Royal Central School of Speech and Drama
Best Actress BAFTA Award winners
Best Actress BAFTA Award (television) winners
Best Supporting Actress Academy Award winners
Best Supporting Actress Golden Globe (film) winners
Dames Commander of the Order of the British Empire
English film actresses
English Shakespearean actresses
English stage actresses
Laurence Olivier Award winners
People from Croydon
Recipients of the King's Medal of Merit in gold
Royal Shakespeare Company members
Spouses of life peers
Volpi Cup for Best Actress winners